This is a list of episodes for the NBC television series The Name of the Game. The star of almost every episode of this rotating series was either Gene Barry as Glenn Howard, Anthony Franciosa (credited as Tony Franciosa)  as Jeff Dillon, or Robert Stack as Dan Farrell. After Franciosa was fired during the third season, the four remaining episodes for which he was contracted starred different actors (Robert Culp, Peter Falk, Robert Wagner) as other characters.

The pilot for this series was the 1966 TV-movie Fame Is the Name of the Game starring Franciosa, along with Susan Saint James (making her debut) and guest stars Jill St. John, Jack Klugman and Robert Duvall.

Series overview
At present, this series has not been released on home video.

The first-season episode "Pineapple Rose" starred actor Cliff Potts rather than one of the usual leads; produced by the Tony Franciosa segment team it was allocated to Gene Barry segment due to his cameo appearances. Second-season episodes "Goodbye Harry" starred Darren McGavin and "Man of The People" starred Vera Miles. Each included Gene Barry in a cameo appearance and was featured as one of Barry's regular rotating segments.

The second-season episode "The King of Denmark" co-starred Tony Franciosa and Susan Saint James (who was given the bigger role in this one episode).

In the third season, Robert Culp (two episodes), Peter Falk and Robert Wagner substituted as "special guest leads" for four episodes in Franciosa's place. The episode "A Capitol Affair" featured guest lead Suzanne Pleshette with Gene Barry providing cameos.

Episodes

Season 1 (1968–69)

 +  A recurring cast member stars in this episode.

Season 2 (1969–70)

 +  A recurring cast member stars in this episode. 
 *  A special guest is the star of this episode.

Season 3 (1970–71)

 *  A special guest is the star of this episode.

Sources
 

Lists of American drama television series episodes